was a Japanese illustrator. He is best known for his music album cover art in the 1970s and 1980s. Artists for whom he illustrated covers include Electric Light Orchestra, Earth, Wind & Fire, Deep Purple, Space, Maze, George Clinton, Kitaro, Rose Royce, Caldera, and Pure Prairie League.

He assisted in the designing of the 1970 Osaka Expo, and was selected as one of the most significant artists in 200 years of American Illustration. He received several awards, along with platinum and gold albums, in recognition of his work. Several books of his artwork have been published, and in 1981 examples of his work were launched into outer space and orbited via the Russian Mir space station.

Other companies and organizations where his work was featured included: NHK Television, TBS Japan, National Geographic, Playboy, Hustler, Penthouse, Shigeo Nagashima and Sadaharu Oh, among many others.

Selected album artwork
 Spitfire - Jefferson Starship, 1976
 All 'N All - Earth, Wind & Fire, 1977
 Out of the Blue - Electric Light Orchestra, 1977
 Deliverance - Space, 1977 (US edition)
 Sunbear, Sunbear, Soul Train Records, 1977
 New Horizons - The Sylvers, 1977
 When We Rock, We Rock, and When We Roll, We Roll - Deep Purple, 1978
 The Best of Earth, Wind & Fire, Vol. 1 - Earth, Wind & Fire, 1978
 Pleasure Principle - Parlet, 1978
 Just Blue - Space, 1978
 I Am - Earth, Wind & Fire, 1979
 Dazz - Kinsman Dazz (early incarnation of the Dazz Band), 1979
 Oasis - Kitaro, 1979
 Can't Hold Back - Pure Prairie League, 1979
 Raise! - Earth, Wind & Fire, 1981

References

External links
 shuseinagaoka.net
 nealnagaoka.com
 
 Entry in The Encyclopedia of Science Fiction
 長岡秀星さん最古の作品発見　高校同級生・篠崎さんが寄贈　７日まで一支国博物館の追悼展で展示 
 ISFDB entry

1936 births
2015 deaths
Album-cover and concert-poster artists
Fantasy artists
Japanese illustrators
Japanese speculative fiction artists
People from Nagasaki
Science fiction artists